Cereus stenogonus, also known as narrow-angled cereus, is a species of Cereus found in Bolivia and Paraguay.

Description

Cereus stenogonus grows tree-like with sparse to richly branched, upright shoots and reaches heights of up to 8 meters. There is a clear, heavily thorn trunk. The cylindrical, blue-green shoots are later light glaucous green and have a diameter of 6 to 9 centimeters. There are four to five deeply notched, high ribs . The areoles sitting in the notches are far apart. The usually three to four spreading, conical thorns emerging from them are thick to onion-shaped at their base. They are yellow with a black tip or black and up to 7 millimeters long.

The slightly pink flowers are 20 to 22 centimeters long. The egg-shaped fruits are up to 10 centimeters long and red. They contain a red pulp.

Distribution
Cereus stenogonus is distributed in Brazil, Mato Grosso do Sul, Paraguay and the Argentine provinces of Chaco, Corrientes and Misiones up to 500 meters above sea level. The first description was published in 1899 by Karl Moritz Schumann.

References

External links
 
 

stenogonus